Future Primitive may refer to:

Literature
 Future Primitive and Other Essays, a 1994 book by John Zerzan
 Future Primitive: The New Ecotopias, a 1994 short-story collection edited by Kim Stanley Robinson

Music
 Bush (British band), originally Future Primitive, an English rock band
 Future Primitive (Paul Haslinger album) or the title song, 1994
 Future Primitive (The Vines album) or the title song, 2011
 "Future Primitive", a song by Grails from Deep Politics, 2011
 "Future Primitive", a song by Santana from Caravanserai, 1972

Other uses
 Future Primitive, a 1985 skateboarding video by Powell Peralta
 Future Primitive, a 2006–2020 podcast by Joanna Harcourt-Smith